This is a list of libraries in the Netherlands. There were about 579 public libraries in the Netherlands in 1997.

National, regional and state libraries

National library of the Netherlands (Koninklijke Bibliotheek), The Hague
Zeeland Library (Zeeuwse Bibliotheek), the official library of the province of Zeeland

Municipal libraries

Central Library of Rotterdam, the public library of Rotterdam
Openbare Bibliotheek Amsterdam, the largest public library system in the Netherlands
Stadsbibliotheek Haarlem, the public library system of Haarlem

Specialized libraries

Afrika-Studiecentrum library, African library and archive, Leiden
American Library in Middelburg.
Artis Library, natural history library, Amsterdam
Atria Institute on gender equality and women's history, public library and research institute dedicated to research and policy advice on gender equality and to the documentation and archival of women's history, Amsterdam
Bibliotheca Philosophica Hermetica, a private library on hermeticism, Amsterdam
Bibliotheca Klossiana, oldest library on Freemasonry in the world, The Hague
Bibliotheca Rosenthaliana, Jewish cultural and historical collection, Amsterdam
Bibliotheca Thysiana, 17th century library in Leiden
Cuypers Library, the largest and oldest art historical library in the Netherlands with a 19th-century reading room, Rijksmuseum Research Library, Amsterdam, Rijksmuseum Research Library, the library of the Rijksmuseum, Amsterdam
Digital Library for Dutch Literature, The Hague
Hector Hodler Library, one of the largest Esperanto libraries, Rotterdam
IHLIA LGBT Heritage, international archive and documentation center on homosexuality, bisexuality and transgender, Amsterdam
KNBF Bondsbibliotheek, a philatelic library in Baarn, near Utrecht
Muziekbibliotheek van de Omroep, library of the Music Broadcasting Center, Hilversum
Netherlands Institute for Art History (Nederlands Instituut voor Kunstgeschiedenis), largest art history centre in the world, The Hague
Peace Palace Library, one of the oldest libraries dedicated to international law, The Hague
Tresoar, Frisian History and Literature Center, Leeuwarden
Zuid-Afrikahuis library, South African library and archive, Amsterdam
Maastricht University Special Collections, the heritage library of Maastricht University

University libraries

Amsterdam University Library, University of Amsterdam
Leiden University Library, Leiden University
Utrecht University Library

Library associations
Netherlands Public Library Association

See also
 Books in the Netherlands
 Open access in the Netherlands
 NARCIS (Netherlands) research portal

References

External links
 Netherlands Public Library Association
 Consortium of Dutch University Libraries
 Libraries in the Netherlands
 Bibliotheca Klossiana in Dutch
 Atria Institute
 Cuypers Library

 
Netherlands
Libraries
Libraries